Michael F. Czerny  (born 18 July 1946) is a Czechoslovakian-born Canadian prelate of the Catholic Church who has been prefect of the Dicastery for Promoting Integral Human Development since 23 April 2022, after serving as interim prefect for several months. He was under secretary of that dicastery's Migrants and Refugees Section from 2017 to 2022. Pope Francis made him a cardinal in 2019.

A member of the Jesuits, Czerny has worked to promote social justice in Canada, Latin America, Africa, and Rome.

Early years
Michael Czerny was born in Brno, Czechoslovakia, on 18 July 1946. His mother's family were Jewish converts to Catholicism. After the Nazis occupied Czechoslovakia, his maternal grandparents and two of his mother's brothers were interned in Terezín, where his grandfather died. The others were moved to Auschwitz and the brothers died in labor camps. Michael's mother, because she was Jewish, was forced into farm labor and then imprisoned for 20 months; his father was forced to farm labor for refusing to divorce her. His parents immigrated to Canada by ship in 1948, bringing Michael and his brother. Following his 1963 graduation from Loyola High School in Montreal, Czerny joined the Jesuits on 14 August 1964. He did his novitiate in Guelph, Ontario, and then studied classics and philosophy at Gonzaga University in Spokane, Washington, earning his bachelor's degree in classics and philosophy in 1968. He taught for a year at Gonzaga High School in St. John's, he pursued further studies in theology in Chicago and at Regis College in Toronto.

On 9 June 1973 he was ordained a priest for the Upper Canadian Province (now the Jesuit Province of Canada) in Willowdale, Ontario. He obtained his doctorate in interdisciplinary studies from the University of Chicago in 1978.

Jesuit initiatives
Czerny co-founded the Jesuit Centre for Social Faith and Justice in Toronto in 1979, and he was the first director until 1989. In 1990–1991, following the murder of six Jesuits and others at the University of Central America in San Salvador, he assumed the director's role of the University's Institute for Human Rights (IDHUCA), a position that had been held by one of the murdered priests. He was also Vice-Rector for Social Outreach.

From 1992 to 2002, Czerny worked in the Social Justice Secretariat at the Jesuit General Curia in Rome. In 2002 he founded the African Jesuit AIDS Network and directed it until 2010. During these nine years, he initiated and coordinated efforts by Jesuits and others in nearly 30 countries of Sub-Saharan Africa to provide pastoral care, education, health services, social and spiritual support, and to fight stigma for victims of HIV/AIDS, and channelled resources from foreign sources. During that time, he also taught at Hekima University College in Nairobi. In 2009, he argued that condoms were ineffective in preventing the spread of HIV in Africa's general population, despite their success "outside Africa and amongst identifiable sub-groups (e.g. prostitutes, gay men)".

Roman Curia
Czerny worked in Rome at the Pontifical Council for Justice and Peace as the personal assistant to Cardinal Peter Turkson from 2010 to 2016.

On 14 December 2016, Pope Francis appointed him under-secretary of the Migrants and Refugees Section of the Dicastery for Promoting Integral Human Development, effective 1 January 2017, along with Scalabrinian Father Fabio Baggio. Discussing his new responsibility, he called migration "one of the most important and urgent human phenomena of our times", adding: "There’s hardly a place in the planet which is not touched by this phenomenon. Indeed, though many are not aware of it, there are more people moving in Russia and China today than in any other part of the world.” 

In 2016 he commissioned Timothy Schmalz to create the Angels Unawares sculpture that depicts a boat carrying migrants and refugees wearing clothes that identify them with a variety of cultures and time periods. It was inaugurated in St. Peter's Square in the Vatican in 2019. 

Francis named him a voting member of the October 2018 Synod of Bishops on Young People, Faith, and Vocational Discernment.

In October 2018, he said the rhetoric used to describe migration and refugee movements was misleading. He said: "It's not a crisis. It's a series of mismanagements and poor policies and self-interested manipulations. The numbers that we're talking about, even on the total scale, are not at all that great."

On 4 May 2019, Francis named him one of two Special Secretaries for the October 2019 Synod of Bishops for the Pan-Amazon region. At the press conference introducing the Synod's concluding document, he said the Church needs to learn to respect cultural differences: "Not to assume that the way I am or the way we are is definitive, is the norm, is the way it has to be … differences have to be embraced". Asked to define what the synod's participants meant by "synodality", he said: "Everyone had a sense of what it meant because we were doing it. Could we explain that in words... does it matter?". A few years before, in 2015, he wrote that there were "limitations and fragmentations" among the organizations of the Amazon before REPAM but the organization coordinated the work of the Catholic Church in the Amazon region and has worked to defend indigenous peoples and the environment.

On 1 September 2019, Pope Francis announced he would make him a cardinal on 5 October 2019. Czerny was surprised by the announcement, which he heard  in Guararema, Brazil, meeting with representatives of the popular movements to prepare for the synod. In accordance with the norm that all cardinals should be bishops, Francis consecrated Czerny a bishop on 4 October, the day before he was scheduled to become a cardinal, making him titular archbishop of Beneventum. The co-consecrators  were Cardinals Pietro Parolin and Peter Turkson. On 5 October, Pope Francis made him a cardinal.

Czerny was named a member of the Congregation for the Evangelization of Peoples on 21 February 2020 and a member of the Pontifical Council for Interreligious Dialogue on 8 July 2020. Czerny was appointed a member of the jury of the Zayed Award for Human Fraternity in June 2021.

In December 2021, in accepting the resignation of Cardinal Peter Turkson as prefect of the Dicastery for Promoting Integral Human Development, Pope Francis named Czerny as temporary prefect as of 1 January 2022. His interim status was removed and he was appointed to a five-year term as prefect on 23 April 2022.

After the Russian invasion of Ukraine, in March 2022, Czerny was sent by Pope Francis with humanitarian aid to Ukraine, along with the papal almoner, Cardinal Konrad Krajewski. This mission, which involved several trips, was considered a highly unusual move of Vatican diplomacy.

Books

See also
Cardinals created by Francis

Notes

References

Additional sources

External links

 

1946 births
20th-century Canadian Jesuits
21st-century Canadian Jesuits
Canadian cardinals
Cardinals created by Pope Francis
Jesuit cardinals
Living people
Czechoslovak emigrants to Canada
University of Chicago Divinity School alumni
Academic staff of Central American University
Clergy from Brno
Canadian people of Czech-Jewish descent